Kim Hwi-lang (born 3 December 1991) is a South Korean taekwondo practitioner. 

She won a silver medal in lightweight at the 2013 World Taekwondo Championships, after being defeated by Carmen Marton in the final. She also competed at the 2011 World Taekwondo Championships.

References

External links

1991 births
Living people
South Korean female taekwondo practitioners
World Taekwondo Championships medalists
21st-century South Korean women